The Monastery of Sourb Nshan of Sebastia is a former Armenian monastic complex near the city of Sivas in Turkey.

Name
"Sourb Nshan" is Armenian for Holy Sign. Sebastia was the historical name of the city of Sivas. The Monastery of Sourb Nshan of Sebastia is a former Armenian monastic complex near the city of Sivas in Turkey.

History
Sourb Nshan monastery was established by prince Atom-Ashot, the son of King Senekerim. The monastery was named after a celebrated relic that Senekerim had brought from Varagavank monastery, and which was returned there after his death. This was one of notable center of enlightenment and scholarship of  Lesser Armenia during Byzantine, Seljuk Sultanate of Rum and Ottoman reigns until the Armenian genocide in 1915. In 1915 Sourb Nshan monastery was the main repository of medieval Armenian manuscripts in the Sebastia region and at least 283 manuscripts are recorded. The library was not destroyed during the Armenian Genocide and most of the manuscripts survived. In 1918 about 100 of them were transferred to the Armenian Patriarchate in Jerusalem.

Current condition 
The monastery today is entirely destroyed and a sprawling military base occupies the site. The date of the destruction is uncertain. The monastery stood on a low hill overlooking Sivas and was surrounded by a plain and undefended outer wall. On one side of that enclosure wall, encircled by a wall of mud brick, was a large garden containing fruit trees and vegetable plots. Several farms were also attached to the monastery.

Appearance

The monastery had three churches – their names were Sourb Astvatsatsin (Holy Mother of God), Sourb Khatch (Holy Cross), and Sourb Hovhannes Karapet (Saint John the Precursor).

References

Armenian churches in Turkey
Christian monasteries established in the 10th century
Destroyed churches
Demolished buildings and structures in Turkey
Buildings and structures demolished in the 20th century
Armenian buildings in Turkey